John Hoover Rothermel (March 7, 1856August 1922) was a Democratic member of the U.S. House of Representatives from Pennsylvania.

John H. Rothermel was born in Richmond Township, Pennsylvania.  He pursued an academic course at Brunner's Business College in Reading, Pennsylvania.  He taught school in Blandon Township, Pennsylvania, from 1876 to 1881.  He served as a member of the faculty at Brunner's Scientific Academy.  He studied law, was admitted to the bar in 1881 and commenced practice in Reading.  He worked as an assistant district attorney of Reading from 1886 to 1889.  He served as county solicitor of Berks County, Pennsylvania from 1895 to 1898.  He was an unsuccessful candidate for judge of the court of common pleas in 1899.

Rothermel was elected as a Democrat to the Sixtieth and to the three succeeding Congresses.  He served as the chairman of the United States House Committee on Expenditures in the Department of Commerce and Labor during the Sixty-second Congress, and of the United States House Committee on Expenditures in the Department of Commerce during the Sixty-third Congress.  He was an unsuccessful candidate for reelection in 1914.  He resumed the practice of law, and died in Reading in 1922.  Interment in Reading's Charles Evans Cemetery.

Sources

The Political Graveyard

1856 births
1922 deaths
Burials at Charles Evans Cemetery
Pennsylvania lawyers
Democratic Party members of the United States House of Representatives from Pennsylvania
19th-century American lawyers